The 1981–82 Greek Football Cup was the 40th edition of the Greek Football Cup.

Tournament details

In total 58 teams participated, 18 from Alpha Ethniki and 40 from Beta Ethniki. It was held in 6 rounds, included final.

It was a competition that remained in history for one of the most discussed matches between the eternal enemies, Panathinaikos and Olympiacos. The match was held just in Second Round, in a single match, and overshadowed everything else in the competition. The match became in Apostolos Nikolaidis Stadium and was judged in extra time, with Panathinaikos to score 3 times (2 goals with penalty, they lost one more) and to finish with 10 players, and Olympiacos to score 2 goals and to be cancelled one more. Αll these happened in first 12 minutes of rivalry. Both teams had complaints by the referee.

In other matches, PAOK won AEK Athens 6–1 and the qualifications of Panathinaikos, against Iraklis in extra time, while the administration of Panathinaikos had prohibited to entry television cameras in the second leg, and against PAOK in semi-finals with a goal to last minute of the second game.

In the Final, they faced AEL who qualified for the first time in their history in a Greek Cup Final. Panathinaikos won 1–0, however was not awarded the cup, but a commemorative trophy, since an objection by Olympiacos was pending at their expense, for the affair of outlaw Hellenisation of footballer Juan Ramón Rocha. The handing-over became two months later, after the end of those events.

Calendar

Knockout phase
Each tie in the knockout phase, apart from the first two rounds and the final, was played over two legs, with each team playing one leg at home. The team that scored more goals on aggregate over the two legs advanced to the next round. If the aggregate score was level, the away goals rule was applied, i.e. the team that scored more goals away from home over the two legs advanced. If away goals were also equal, then extra time was played. The away goals rule was again applied after extra time, i.e. if there were goals scored during extra time and the aggregate score was still level, the visiting team advanced by virtue of more away goals scored. If no goals were scored during extra time, the winners were decided by a penalty shoot-out. In the first two rounds and the final, which were played as a single match, if the score was level at the end of normal time, extra time was played, followed by a penalty shoot-out if the score was still level.The mechanism of the draws for each round is as follows:
There are no seedings, and teams from the same group can be drawn against each other.

First round

|}

Bracket

Second round

|}

Round of 16

|}

Quarter-finals

|}

Semi-finals

|}

Final

The 38th Greek Cup Final was played at the AEK Stadium.

References

External links
Greek Cup 1981-82 at RSSSF

Greek Football Cup seasons
Greek Cup
Cup